Rodina (Bulgarian and Russian Родина: "homeland", Czech: "family") may refer to:

People with the surname
Anastassiya Rodina (born 1991), Kazakhstani handball player
Evgeniya Rodina (born 1989), Russian tennis player
Marina Rodina (born 1980), birth name of Russian YouTube user
Irina Rodina (born 1973), Russian judoka
Vadym Rodina (born 1988), Ukrainian football defender
Viktoria Rodina (born 1989), Russian politician
Yelena Gulyayeva (née Rodina, 1967), Russian high jumper

Places
 Rodina, a village in Ariniș Commune, Maramureș County, Romania
Rodina Stadium (Khimki), Russia
Rodina Stadium (Kirov), Russia
 Hotel Rodina in Sofia, Bulgaria

Other uses
 Rodina (political party), a political party of Russia
 Rodina (TV series), a Russian television series based on the Israeli series Hatufim and the American series Homeland
 Rodina (magazine), a Russian historical illustrated magazine 
 Rodina-class motorship, a Russian river passenger ship
 Rodina watch I, first Russian automatic wristwatch, made by the First Moscow Watch Factory from 1956 through the early 1960s
 Mother Motherland, a personification of the Soviet Union in artwork
The Rodina, a graphic design studio based in The Hague, Netherlands
Rodina Kirov, a Russian bandy club
Rodina, a song by Soviet rock band DDT

See also
 Rodinia, ancient supercontinent derived from rodina ("homeland")